Rolitetracycline is a tetracycline antibiotic. Tetracycline is N-Mannich base prodrug that is prepared from tetracycline by condensation with pyrrolidine and formaldehyde to produce rolitetracycline. Rolitetracycline is used as an antibacterial drug, a protein synthesis inhibitor, an antiprotozoal drug and a prodrug.

References

Tetracycline antibiotics
Pyrrolidines
Triketones